Denisia obscurella is a moth of the family Oecophoridae. It was described by Wilhelm Brandt in 1937. It is found in Scandinavia and northern Russia.

The wingspan is 12–18 mm. Adults are on wing from May to July.

References

 "Denisia obscurella (Brandt, 1937)". Insecta.pro. Retrieved February 5, 2020.

Moths described in 1937
Oecophoridae
Moths of Europe